Vincent Fang Kang, GBS, JP (born 7 May 1943 in Shanghai) is the leader of the Liberal Party of Hong Kong. He is a Hong Kong entrepreneur in the garment industry and a former member of the Legislative Council of Hong Kong, representing the Wholesale and Retail functional constituency.

Early life, education and business career
Fang was born in Shanghai, China on 7 May 1943 during the Second Sino-Japanese War. He moved to Hong Kong and attended Wah Yan College, an eminent Jesuit all-boys secondary school in Hong Kong, graduating in 1962. He later obtained both his bachelor's and master's degrees in Science of Textiles Engineering from the North Carolina State University in 1967 and 1969 respectively. After he returned to Hong Kong, he became the Chief Executive of the Toppy Company (Hong Kong) Ltd, a garment company located in Kwai Chung and also managing director of Fantastic Garments Limited.

Fang has been an Independent Non Executive Director of The Wharf (Holdings) Limited since July 1993. He also served as honorary advisor of Hong Kong Retail Management Association, chairman of the Association of Better Business & Tourism Services and the Director of The Federation of Hong Kong Garment Manufacturers.

Legislative Councillor
Fang is a core member of the pro-business Liberal Party. In the 2004 Legislative Council election, he succeeded Selina Chow Liang Shuk-yee to serve as member of the Legislative Council of Hong Kong through Wholesale and Retail functional constituency when Chow contested in the geographical constituency direct election in New Territories West.

In 2008 after Chairman James Tien Pei-chun and Vice-chairwoman Selina Chow both resigned from the posts after their defeat in the Legislative Council election, he became the vice-chairman with Tommy Cheung Yu-yan. He acted as Chairman when Miriam Lau Kin-yee resigned as chairwoman after she failed to bid for a seat in Hong Kong Island in the 2012 Legislative Council election. He became the Leader of the Liberal Party in 2014, when James Tien was stripped from the Chinese People's Political Consultative Conference after calling for Chief Executive CY Leung to resign during the 2014 Hong Kong protests.

In April 2010, Fang's suggestion that the minimum wage should be set at HK$20 per hour drew fire both from the public and from his own party. His statement made a case for those in the community who criticise functional constituency lawmakers as disconnected from the worries and realities of the public at large. He also had the lowest attendance and voting record among lawmakers in the 2008–2012 Legislative Council.

Fang has been appointed member of the Hong Kong Hospital Authority (2000–2006), Hong Kong Tourism Board (2003–2009) and Hong Kong Housing Authority (2009–2015). He is also a member of the Operations Review Committee of the Independent Commission Against Corruption (ICAC) and a board member of the Hong Kong Airport Authority (2005–2011). He was awarded the Silver Bauhinia Star (SBS) by the Hong Kong SAR Government in 2008.

References

External links

Official Site of Vincent Fang
Official Biographies of Legislative Councillors
Toppy Group

1943 births
Living people
Hong Kong textiles industry businesspeople
Politicians from Shanghai
Liberal Party (Hong Kong) politicians
Businesspeople from Shanghai
North Carolina State University alumni
HK LegCo Members 2004–2008
HK LegCo Members 2008–2012
HK LegCo Members 2012–2016
The Wharf (Holdings)
Recipients of the Gold Bauhinia Star
Recipients of the Silver Bauhinia Star
Members of the Election Committee of Hong Kong, 2017–2021